Frank of Ireland is an Irish comedy television series created by brothers Brian Gleeson and Domhnall Gleeson, and Michael Moloney. It premiered in the United Kingdom on Channel 4 on 15 April 2021  and in the United States, Canada and Australia on Amazon Prime on 16 April 2021.

Premise
Frank Marron is a thirty-something unemployed man-child living with his mother, Mary. Frank continues to keep his hopes alive for a singer/songwriter career, but he excels only at manipulatively ruining things for his improbably loyal best friend, Doofus, and dragging down his on-again-off-again girlfriend, Áine. The show is set in a suburb of Dublin, Ireland.

Cast and characters

 Brian Gleeson as Frank 
 Domhnall Gleeson as Doofus
 Pom Boyd as Mary
 Sarah Greene as Áine

References

External links
 

2021 British television series debuts
2020s British comedy television series
2021 Irish television series debuts
2020s Irish television series
Channel 4 comedy
Channel 4 sitcoms
English-language television shows
Irish comedy television series
Television shows set in the Republic of Ireland